Mladí Espéďáci, abbreviated to MES, is a Youth Wing of Czech nationalist party Freedom and Direct Democracy. It was established in April 2021.

History
Organisation was established in April 2021 when its Facebook website was launched. Freedom and Direct Democracy was the last parliamentary party without Youth Wing. It quickly gained large number of likes and followers on Facebook. It focused mainly on same topics as the main party such as Migration, Islam and European Union. Martin Malášek became the first leader of MES. Diana Chodžajanová who competed in Česko hledá SuperStar became one of main faces of the organisation as she started making short clips to promote the organisation. In July 2022 it gained some attention when Facebook organisation's site of the Facebook.

References

External links
Facebook Website

Freedom and Direct Democracy
2021 establishments in the Czech Republic
Political parties established in 2021
Youth wings of political parties in the Czech Republic